Thulung or Thulung luwa is a  Kirati languages or  Thulung language spoken in parts of Nepal and Sikkim.

References

Sources

External links
Allen, N.J. Sketch of Thulung Grammar: with three texts and a glossary. Cornell East Asia Series. Ithaca, New York, 1975. (Full text.)

Languages of Sikkim
Languages of Nepal
Kiranti languages
Languages of Koshi Province